
This is a list of aircraft in alphabetical order beginning with 'S'.

Sc

SCA
(Société Commercial Aéronautique, France)
 SCA SFR-10

SCA 
(Stabilimento Costruzioni Aeronautiche)
 SCA SS.2
 SCA SS.3

SCA 
(Società Costruzioni Aeronautiche Guidonia)
 SCA A.Q.V
 S.C.A. 2
 S.C.A. 3

SCAL
(Societe de Constructions et d'Aviation Legere)
 SCAL FB.20 Rubis
 SCAL FB.30 Avion Bassou
 SCAL FB.31
 SCAL FB.41 Rubis

Scaled Composites 
(United States)
(for Rutan models up to 79 see Rutan Aircraft Factory)

 Scaled Composites Model 80 Grizzly
 Scaled Composites Model 81 Catbird
 Scaled Composites Model 89
 Scaled Composites Model 91 Lotus Microlight
 Scaled Composites Model 97 Microlight
 Scaled Composites Model 115 Starship
 Scaled Composites Model 115 Starship
 Scaled Composites Model 120 Predator
 Scaled Composites Model 115 Starship
 Scaled Composites Model 133 ATTT
 Scaled Composites Model 143 Triumph
 Scaled Composites Model 144 CM-44
 Scaled Composites Model 151 ARES
 Scaled Composites Model 158 Pond Racer
 Scaled Composites Model 173 Loral TFV
 Scaled Composites Model 179 Lockheed PLADS Rockbox
 Scaled Composites Model 191
 Scaled Composites Model 202 Boomerang
 Scaled Composites Model 206, second preliminary design for heavy airlaunch (1991)
 Scaled Composites Model 226 Raptor
 Scaled Composites Model 233 Freewing
 Scaled Composites Model 247 Vantage
 Scaled Composites Model 271 V-Jet II
 Scaled Composites Model 276 NASA X-38
 Scaled Composites Model 281 Proteus
 Scaled Composites Model 287 NASA ERAST
 Scaled Composites Model 302 Toyota TAA-1
 Scaled Composites Model 309 Adam M-309
 Scaled Composites Model 311 Virgin Atlantic GlobalFlyer
 Tier One
 Scaled Composites Model 316 SpaceShipOne
 Scaled Composites Model 318 White Knight
 Tier 1b
 Scaled Composites Model 339 SpaceShipTwo
 Scaled Composites Model 348 WhiteKnightTwo
 Scaled Composites Model 351 Stratolaunch
 Scaled Composites Model 326 Northrop Grumman X-47A
 Scaled Composites Model 351
 Scaled Composites Model 367 BiPod
 USAF Hunter-Killer project
 Scaled Composites Model 395
 Scaled Composites Model 396
 Scaled Composites B-2 Spirit: Scale model pole-mounted B-2 for radar cross section tests
 Scaled Composites Bell Eagle Eye
 Scaled Composites Space Industries Comet
 Scaled Composites DC-X: Constructed the structural aeroshell and control surfaces under contract to McDonnell Douglas
 Scaled Composites Earthwinds
 Scaled Composites Kistler Zero
 Scaled Composites IAI Searcher: longer-winged version of Pioneer UAV
 Scaled Composites Roton ATV
 Scaled Composites SpaceShipThree
 Scaled Composites Model TRA324 Scarab
 Scaled Composites Orbital Sciences Pegasus rocket
 Scaled Composites Triumph
 SpaceShipOne

SCAM
(Société des Constructions Aéronautiques du Maine)
 SCAM C.50 Milane II

SCAN
(Société de Constructions Aéro-Navales de Port-Neuf , France)
 SCAN 20
 SCAN 30
 SCAN 40

Schaap-Sestak
(Schaap-Sestak Aviation Co. of Chicago / Frank Pontkowsky (designer))
 Schaap-Sestak 1914 scout

Schad 
(Adolph R Schad, 105 Mechanic St, Cleburne TX. 1936: Keene, Texas, United States)
 Schad 1927 Monoplane

Schapel 
( (Rodney E) Schapel Aircraft Co, Reno, Nevada, United States)
 Schapel S-350 Mini-Swat
 Schapel S-525 Super Swat
 Schapel S-882
 Schapel S-981 Swat
 Schapel S-1080 Thunderbolt
 Schapel S-1275 Finesse

Schaupp 
(Paul Schaupp & John Doke, Inglewood, California, United States)
 Schaupp 1951 Monoplane

Schauss 
(Al Schauss, Minneapolis, Minnesota, United States. 1935: Schauss & (Edward C) Lampman.)
 Schauss 1931 Monoplane
 Schauss A
 Schauss-Lampman Sport

Scheibe 
 Scheibe Bergfalke
 Scheibe Spatz
 Scheibe Zugvogel
 Scheibe SF-21
 Scheibe SF-23 Sperling
 Scheibe SF-24 Motor Spatz
 Scheibe SF-25 Falke
 Scheibe SF-26
 Scheibe SF-27
 Scheibe SF-28 Tandem Falke
 Scheibe SF-33
 Scheibe SF-34
 Scheibe SF-36
 Scheibe SF 40

Scheller 
(Bernhard Scheller)
 Scheller S.IV-32b(NASM doc no. AS-204510-01)

Schempp-Hirth 
(Martin Schempp & Wolf Hirth)
 Göppingen Gö 8
 Göppingen Gö 9 development aircraft for Do 335 Pfeil
 Schempp-Hirth GS.6 Milan

Scheutzow 
((Webb) Scheutzow Helicopter Corp, Berea, Ohio, United States)
 Scheutzow Flexhub
 Scheutzow Model B

Schiefer 
(Schiefer & Sons Aeroplane Co, San Diego, California, United States / Schieffer-Robbins)
 Schiefer RS

Schiell 
(Schiell Co. of Brașov)
 Schiell Ra.Bo.

Schill 
(Vermont Air Transport Co, Schill Airport, Milton, Vermont, United States)
 Schill 1914 Biplane
 Schill B-1
 Schill Gull Wing

Schleicher 
 Schleicher ASW 12
 Schleicher ASK 13
 Schleicher ASK 14
 Schleicher ASW 15
 Schleicher ASK 16
 Schleicher ASW 17
 Schleicher ASK 18
 Schleicher ASW 19
 Schleicher ASW XV
 Schleicher ASW 20
 Schleicher ASK 21
 Schleicher ASW 22
 Schleicher ASK 23
 Schleicher ASW 24
 Schleicher ASH 25
 Schleicher ASH 26
 Schleicher ASW 27
 Schleicher ASW 28
 Schleicher ASG 29
 Schleicher Ka 2
 Schleicher Ka 3
 Schleicher Ka 4
 Schleicher Ka 6
 Schleicher K 6E
 Schleicher Ka 7
 Schleicher Ka 8
 Schleicher Ka 9
 Schleicher Ka 10
 Schleicher Ka 11
 Schleicher Luftkurort Poppenhausen
 Schleicher Stadt Frankfurt

Schmeidler 
(Dipl. Ing. Werner Schmeidler)
 Schmeidler SN.2

Schmid
(Adalbert Schmid) 
 Schmid SC-28 Wolke ornithopter
 Schmid 1947 ornithopter
 Schmid Kleinflugzeug Mücke

Schmidtler
(Ultraleichtflug Schmidtler, Munich, Germany)
Schmidtler Enduro

Schmidt 
(Bruno Hermann Schmidt/U S Aerial Navigation Co, Homestead, New Jersey, United States)
 Schmidt 1911 Biplane

Schmitt
(Maximilian Schmitt Aeroplane & Motor Works, 96 Dale Ave, Paterson, New Jersey, United States)
 Schmitt 1914 Monoplane

Schmuck Brothers 
(Edward W & Charles T) Schmuck Bros Aircraft Co, 981 Amalia Ave/Eastside Monarch Aero Corp Airport, Los Angeles, California, United States. 1930: West Coast Aircraft Corp, Los Angeles.)
 Schmuck S-1 Commercial Sport a.k.a. Monarch
 Schmuck S-3 Sport a.k.a. Monarch
 West Coast WCK-2 Sportster a.k.a. Monarch

Schneider 
(Edmund Schneider Germany)
 Schneider ESM 5
 Schneider Motor-Baby

Schneider 
(Edmund Schneider Australia)
 Schneider ES 49
 Schneider ES-52 Kookaburra
 Schneider ES-59
 Schneider ES-65
 Schneider Grunau Baby

Schneider
(Société des Avions Schneider)
 Schneider Sch-10M
 Schneider Henri-Paul

Schneider 
(Flugmaschine Fabrik Franz Schneider G.m.b.H.)
 Schneider fighter 1918

Schoenenberg 
(Heinrich Schoenenberg)
 Schoenenberg HS 9 Biplane

Schoettler
(Ferdinand Leopold Schoettler and Ernst Fuetterer – China)
 Schoettler I Dulux Dashatou
 Schoettler III
 Schoettler B3
 Schoettler S4
 Schoettler C4

Scholz 
(Richard Scholz)
 Scholz Alter Adler

Scholz
(Scholz (aircraft constructor))
 Scholz SS-1

Schönleber
(Schönleber Metallbau GbR,  Schönaich, Germany)
Schönleber Vento

Schramm 
(Schramm Aircraft Company)
 Schramm Javelin
 Schramm Scorpion

Schreder 
 Schreder Airmate HP-8
 Schreder Airmate HP-9
 Schreder Airmate HP-10
 Schreder Airmate HP-11
 Schreder HP-7
 Schreder HP-12
 Schreder HP-12A
 Schreder HP-13
 Schreder HP-14
 Schreder HP-15
 Schreder HP-16
 Schreder HP-17
 Schreder HP-18
 Schreder HP-19
 Schreder HP-20
 Schreder HP-21
 Schreder HP-22
 Schreder RS-15

Schretzmann 
(Walter Schretzmann)
 Schretzmann S.W.1 Pegasus

Schröder Expeditions Gyrocopter
(Akelsbarg, Germany)
Schröder AS-140 Mücke

Schroeder 
(E A Schroeder, 1765 Dolores St, San Francisco, California, United States)
 Schroeder Cyclogyro a.k.a. S-1

Schroeder 
(Richard E Schroeder, Toledo, Ohio, United States)
 Schroeder Air Mate

Schroeder-Wentworth 
(Mercury Aircraft Corp, (Rudolph W "Shorty" Schroeder & John R Wentworth), Hammondsport, New York, United States)
 Schroeder-Wentworth 1929 Monoplane

Schubert 
(E Alvin Schubert, Galesville, Wisconsin, United States)
 Schubert Der Fledermaus

Schütte-Lanz
(Luftschiffbau Schütte-Lanz)

 Schütte-Lanz C.I
 Schütte-Lanz D.I
 Schütte-Lanz D.II
 Schütte-Lanz D.III
 Schütte-Lanz D.IV
 Schütte-Lanz D.V
 Schütte-Lanz D.VI
 Schütte-Lanz D.VII
 Schütte-Lanz Dr.I
 Schütte-Lanz G.I
 Schütte-Lanz G.II
 Schütte-Lanz G.III
 Schütte-Lanz G.IV
 Schütte-Lanz G.V
 Schütte-Lanz R.I

Schwade 
(Schwade Flugzeug und Motorenbau)
 Kampfeinsitzer Nr1 1914
 Kampfeinsitzer Nr2 1915

Schweizer 
(Schweizer Aircraft Corp, Elmira, New York, United States)
 Schweizer Ag Cat
 Schweizer SGP 1-1
 Schweizer SGU 1-2
 Schweizer SGU 1-3
 Schweizer SGU 1-6
 Schweizer SGU 1-7
 Schweizer SGS 2-8
 Schweizer cargo glider designs
 Schweizer SGC 8-10
 Schweizer SGC 15-11
 Schweizer SGS 2-12
 Schweizer SGC 6-14
 Schweizer SGC 1-15
 Schweizer SGU 1-16
 Schweizer SGS 1-17
 Schweizer SGS 2-18
 Schweizer SGU 1-19
 Schweizer SGU 1-20
 Schweizer SGS 1-21
 Schweizer SGU 2-22
 Schweizer SGS 1-23
 Schweizer SGS 1-24
 Schweizer SGS 2-25
 Schweizer SGS 1-26
 Schweizer 2-27
 Schweizer 7-28
 Schweizer SGS 1-29
 Schweizer SA 1-30
 Schweizer SA 2-31
 Schweizer SGS 2-32
 Schweizer SGS 2-33
 Schweizer SGS 1-34
 Schweizer SGS 1-35
 Schweizer SGS 1-36 Sprite
 Schweizer SGM 2-37
 Schweizer TG-2
 Schweizer TG-3
 Schweizer X-26 Frigate

Ścibor-Rylski
(Adam Ścibor-Rylski)
 Ścibor-Rylski ŚR-3

Scintex Aviation
(France)
 Scintex CP-301 C Emeraude
 Scintex CP-315 C Emeraude
 Scintex CP-1310 C3 Super Emeraude
 Scintex CP-1315 C3 Super Emeraude
 Scintex ML.145 Rubis
 Scintex ML.250 Rubis

Scott 
(James F Scott, Chicago, Illinois, United States)
 Scott 1909 aerodyne
 Scott 1910 aerodyne

Scott 
(Ronald Scott, Waukesha, Wisconsin, United States)
 Scott XS-1 Ol' Ironside

Scott (aircraft constructor) 
 Scott SE.5

Scott 
(Allen Scott, Pine Bluff, Arkansas, United States)
 Scott Hoopo

Scottish Aeroplane Syndicate 
(United Kingdom)
 Scottish Aeroplane Syndicate Avis

Scottish Aviation 
(United Kingdom)
 Scottish Aviation Bulldog
 Scottish Aviation Bullfinch
 Scottish Aviation Pioneer
 Scottish Aviation Twin Pioneer

Scout 
(Scout Airplane Co. (Pacific Air Industries), Los Angeles, California, United States)
 Scout Monoplane

Scoville 
(John R Scoville, Rochester, New York, United States)
 Scoville Stardust

SC Paragliding
(Kharkiv, Ukraine)
SC Discovery
SC Scorpion

Scroggs 
(Roy B Scroggs, Eugene, Oregon, United States)
 The Last Laugh

SCWL
(SCWL SA)
 SCWAL 101

References

Further reading

External links

 List Of Aircraft (S)

de:Liste von Flugzeugtypen/N–S
fr:Liste des aéronefs (N-S)
nl:Lijst van vliegtuigtypes (N-S)
pt:Anexo:Lista de aviões (N-S)
ru:Список самолётов (N-S)
sv:Lista över flygplan/N-S
vi:Danh sách máy bay (N-S)